The John Cheyney Log Tenant House and Farm, also known as the Thomas Huston Farm, is a historic home and associated buildings located at Cheyney, Delaware County, Pennsylvania. The complex includes four contributing buildings, dated from c. 1760 to c. 1870: a part log, part stucco over stone vernacular residence; a stone and frame barn; a "garage" containing a forge and farm kitchen; and a stone spring house.  The residence, or tenant house, consists of a -story log section, built about 1800, connected to a 3-story stucco over stone section, built between 1815 and 1848.

It was added to the National Register of Historic Places in 1978.

References

Houses on the National Register of Historic Places in Pennsylvania
Houses in Delaware County, Pennsylvania
National Register of Historic Places in Delaware County, Pennsylvania